Dom O'Donnell  was a Gaelic footballer from Tralee, County Kerry. He played Gaelic football with his local club John Mitchels, and was a member of the Kerry senior inter-county team during the 1960s. He won Munster Championship medals in 1962 and 1964. In 1964, he also won an All Ireland Under 21 medal as captain of the winning team.

At club level, O'Donnell was part of the famed John Mitchels team of the late 1950s and 1960s, winning six Kerry Senior Football Championships (five in a row from 1959 to 1963 and again in 1966).

References

Year of birth missing (living people)
Living people
John Mitchels (Kerry) Gaelic footballers
Kerry inter-county Gaelic footballers